Zain Abbas may refer to:

 Zain Abbas (cricketer, born 1986), Hong Kong cricketer
 Zain Abbas (cricketer, born 1991), Pakistani cricketer